Daniel Day is an English professional darts player who plays in Professional Darts Corporation (PDC) tournaments.

Career

Day qualified for the 2018 BDO World Darts Championship as one of the Regional Table Qualifiers and played Craig Caldwell in the preliminary round. The following year, he once again qualified for the 2019 BDO Championship and competed in the first round against Dean Reynolds.

World Championship results

BDO

 2018: First round (lost to Martin Phillips 1–3)
 2019: First round (lost to Dean Reynolds 1–3)

References

External links
Daniel Day's profile and stats on Darts Database

Living people
English darts players
British Darts Organisation players
1988 births